Djebelemur is an extinct genus of early strepsirrhine primate from the late early or early middle Eocene period from the Chambi locality in Tunisia. Although they probably lacked a toothcomb, a specialized dental structure found in living lemuriforms (lemurs and lorisoids), they are thought to be a related stem group.

Djebelemur is one of five genera of djebelemurids, others including 'Anchomomys' milleri, a fossil primate formerly thought to be related to other members of the genus Anchomomys, a group of Eocene European adapiform primates. Following its discovery and description in 1992, Djebelemur was thought to be either a relative of European adapiforms or an early simian, mostly due to the fragmentary nature of the lower jaw and two isolated upper molars that may not belong with the jaw. By 2006, it was viewed as a stem lemuriform.

Etymology 
The name "Djebelemur" derives from the mountainous outcrops in which the first specimens were found: Arabic djebel means "mountain". The species was named in honor of geologist C. Martinez, who was the guide and host for the field party that made the discovery.

Evolutionary history 
The fragmentary remains of Djebelemur martinezi are morphologically similar to those of 'Anchomomys' milleri, a fossil primate originally described as a type of cercamoniine (early adapiforms found in the northern continents). Despite significant differences in age, with D. martinezi dating to the late early or early middle Eocene (~52–46 million years ago) and A.' milleri dating to the late Eocene (36 million years ago), they form a clade and are both grouped under the family Djebelemuridae.

Djebelemurids appear to be a primitive sister group to lemuriforms and the more closely related Plesiopithecus, all of which form an Afro-Arabian clade that excludes the adapids or notharctids from the northern continents. Both are considered stem lemuriforms because despite sharing a number of traits, it is suspected that they lacked a toothcomb, a dental feature unique to lemuriforms.

The confirmed presence of djebelemurids in Eocene Africa is important because it proves that lemuriforms evolved their toothcomb in Africa and differentiated there. This Afro-Arabian clade of stem lemuriforms are thought to have arrived in Africa too early to have descended from the Holarctic adapiforms. All dental similarities between the Afro-Arabian clade and European anchomomyins may be due to convergent evolution because the traits appear in the early Eocene (Ypresian stage) in the relatively poor fossil record of Africa long before they appear in the fossil-rich deposits of Europe during the mid-Lutetian. This ancient stem lineage of lemuriform primates in Africa possibly descended from an early Asian branch of adapiforms such as a primitive branch of cercamoniines predating Donrussellia (one of the oldest European adapiforms).

Taxonomy 
Djebelemur martinezi was first described in 1992 by Hartenberger and Marandat. The description was based on a lower jaw fragment and two isolated upper molars found in Tunisia at the Chambi locality, which date to the late early or early middle Eocene. It was described as an adapiform, possibly related to the cercamoniine branch, with the informal suggestion that it might merit its own subfamily, "Djebelemurinae". This interpretation was based on their support of the hypothesis favored by paleoanthropologist Philip D. Gingerich and others that simians (monkeys, apes, and humans) were descended from African adapids, which in turn were descended from the adapids of Europe. They based their assumptions of simian relations on the two isolated upper molars, which are now seen as being incompatible with the lower dentition on the jaw. The upper molars were highly bunodont (having cusps that are separate and rounded)—a trait seen in simians—whereas the lower molars were crested. No definitive upper teeth for Djebelemur are known, but could yield surprises if found.

In 1994, paleoanthropologist Marc Godinot described Djebelemur as an early simian, along with Algeripithecus, once considered a basal simian, but now considered to be a distant stem lemuriform (lemurs and lorisoids). Godinot saw similarities between Djebelemur and early simians, as well as cercamoniines, but also noted issues of premolar and molar compaction that set it apart from European adapiforms. In 1997, Hartenberger continued to favor adapiform affinities, while in 1998, Godinot considered affinities with lemuriforms ("crown strepsirrhines") while still favoring simian affinities, particularly with oligopithecids. By 2006, Godinot accepted Djebelemur as a stem lemuriform, admitting that he was misled by the lack of a toothcomb—a distinguishing dental feature of living lemuriform primates—despite other dental similarities. He also noted that the lower molars of lemuriforms and simians can be difficult to distinguish. As of 2010, Djebelemur is still considered a stem lemuriform in the family Djebelemuridae, although its infraorder is unnamed.

Anatomy and physiology 
It was thought to lack a toothcomb since its canine teeth were only moderately reduced.

Notes

References

Literature cited 

 
 
 
 
 
 
 
 

Prehistoric strepsirrhines
Eocene primates
Fossil taxa described in 1992
Eocene mammals of Africa
Prehistoric primate genera